Dynastor is a genus of butterflies in the family Nymphalidae. Members of the genus can be found from Mexico to Central and South America.

It consists of three species which feed on Bromeliaceae species. These are the only nymphalid species that do so.

Species
Dynastor darius (Fabricius, 1775)
Dynastor macrosiris (Westwood, 1851)
Dynastor napoleon Doubleday, [1849]

References

External links
tolweb.org

Morphinae
Nymphalidae of South America
Nymphalidae genera